Ardis may refer to:

Ardis (given name)
Ardis, Ottoman Empire
Ardis (retailer), a supermarket chain in Algiers, Algeria
Ardis Furnace, an abandoned experimental blast furnace in Michigan
Ardis Publishing, a Russian-English publishing company
Advanced Radio Data Information Services (ARDIS), a wireless data network
Ardiz-e Olya or Ardīs, Iran

People with the surname
Jim Ardis, mayor of Peoria, Illinois

Irish feminine given names
Scottish feminine given names